The Roman Catholic Diocese of Bacabal is a diocese located in the city of Bacabal in the Ecclesiastical province of São Luís do Maranhão in Brazil.

History
 22 June 1968: Established as Diocese of Bacabal from the Territorial Prelature of São José do Grajaú and Metropolitan Archdiocese of São Luís do Maranhão

Bishops
 Bishops of Bacabal (Latin Rite)
 Pascàsio Rettler, O.F.M. (1968.07.24 – 1989.12.01)
 Henrique Johannpötter, O.F.M. (1989.12.02 – 1997.04.10)
 José Belisário da Silva, O.F.M. (1999.12.01 – 2005.09.21), appointed Archbishop of São Luís do Maranhão, Brazil
 Armando Martín Gutiérrez, F.A.M. (2006.11.02 – present)

Coadjutor bishop
Henrique Johannpötter, O.F.M. (1988–1989)

Other priest of this diocese who became bishop
Jacinto Furtado de Brito Sobrinho, appointed Bishop of Crateús, Ceara in 1998

References
 GCatholic.org
 Catholic Hierarchy

Roman Catholic dioceses in Brazil
Christian organizations established in 1968
Bacabal, Roman Catholic Diocese of
Roman Catholic dioceses and prelatures established in the 20th century